XHBOC-FM is a radio station on 95.1 FM in Bocoyna, Chihuahua. It is known as La Patrona de San Juanito.

History
La Voz de la Sierra Tarahumara applied for radio stations at Bocoyna and Urique in August 2015, and their concessions were approved by the Federal Telecommunications Institute on December 13, 2017. The station signed on in June 2018. The station is associated with commercial operator Grupo Bustillos Radio, which owns the two commercial radio stations in Guachochi.

References

Radio stations in Chihuahua
Radio stations established in 2018
2018 establishments in Mexico